The 2021–22 season is Partick Thistle's first season back in the second tier of Scottish football in the Scottish Championship, having been promoted from League One at the end of the 2020–21 season.

Summary
On 3 June 2021, Queens Park announced a groundshare agreement with Partick Thistle to play their home matches at Firhill Stadium while redevelopment work continues at Lesser Hampden.

On 14 December, Thistle competed in their first fixture of the renewed Glasgow Cup tournament, which had been cancelled the previous two years because of the ongoing pandemic.

Results and fixtures

Pre-season

Scottish Championship

Premiership play-off

Scottish League Cup

Group stage

Scottish Challenge Cup

Scottish Cup

Glasgow Cup

Squad statistics

Player statistics

|-
|colspan="12"|Players who left the club during the 2021–22 season
|-

|}

Club statistics

League table

League Cup table

Glasgow Cup table

Transfers

In

Out

Loans In

Loans Out

See also
 List of Partick Thistle F.C. seasons

References

Partick Thistle F.C. seasons
Partick Thistle